The Cadillac XT6 is a mid-size luxury crossover SUV with three-row seating manufactured by General Motors. The vehicle was introduced on January 12, 2019, at the North American International Auto Show. It went on sale in June 2019 as a 2020 model.

Overview

The XT6 (short for Crossover Touring 6) is Cadillac’s third crossover SUV, and the largest in Cadillac's XT series, slotted between the XT5 and the full size SUV Escalade. The XT6 is produced at GM's Spring Hill, Tennessee plant, while the Chinese-market XT6 is manufactured in Shanghai by SAIC-GM. The XT6 went on sale in Russia in February 2020.  It also went on sale in Japan in early 2020 with one trim level, six-passenger seating, and left hand drive configuration.

While it serves as the high luxury counterpart to the mid-size 3-row Chevrolet Traverse and Buick Enclave in the crossover SUV segment, the XT6 shares its wheelbase with the mid-size GMC Acadia, Cadillac XT5, and the Chinese version of the Chevrolet Blazer. Cadillac describes the XT6 as a “mid-size plus” vehicle as they see the XT5 as their primary mid-size CUV.

Seating
The XT6 features standard seven passenger seating, with a six-seat configuration as an option.

Powertrain
The XT6 comes with either a 2.0L I4 turbo engine, making  or a 3.6L V6 LGX engine, making .  Each engine is mated to a nine-speed automatic transmission with next-generation Electronic Precision Shift.  A choice of AWD and FWD are offered.

Trim levels
Trim levels on the XT6 include "Luxury", "Premium Luxury", and "Sport".

Reception
The XT6 received mixed reviews, with XT6's styling and features being particularly criticized as reviewers believed both pale in comparison to the concurrently launched Lincoln Aviator. Reviewers also criticized the lack of an optional hybrid powertrain, which is available on a number of the XT6's competitors. Car & Driver gave it a lukewarm review: "It fails to match its competitors' luxury quotients or meaningfully set itself apart from its GMC and Chevrolet-badged siblings," Cars.com called the XT6 "underwhelming," while The Drive notes "For everything the XT6 gets right, it’s hard not to think that the much more interesting Lincoln Aviator with its handsome look, posh interior, and a high-performance plug-in hybrid option is going to eat this Caddy's lunch."

Sales

References

External links
 

XT6
Cars introduced in 2019
Luxury crossover sport utility vehicles
2020s cars